The 2017 Inter-Provincial Cup was the fifth edition of the Inter-Provincial Cup, a List A cricket competition played in Ireland. It was held from 1 May to 10 September 2017. It was the first edition of the competition to be played with List A status, following the outcome of a meeting by the International Cricket Council (ICC) in October 2016. Three teams competed; Leinster Lightning, North West Warriors and Northern Knights, with Leinster Lightning being the defending champions. Leinster Lightning retained their title, after North West Warriors won their match against Northern Knights on 6 August, giving Leinster Lightning an unassailable lead in the competition.

Points table
The following teams competed:

 Champions

Fixtures

1st match

2nd match

3rd match

4th match

5th match

6th match

References

External links
 Series home at ESPN Cricinfo

Inter
Inter-Provincial Cup seasons